James Robinson (3 Feb 1915 – Mar 1992) was an English professional rugby league footballer who played in the 1930s, 1940s and 1950s. He also appeared for both Wigan (Heritage № 492) and rivals St Helens (Heritage № 611), plus Oldham RLFC (Heritage № 444) as a World War II guest player.

Playing career

International honours
Jimmy Robinson won a cap for England while at Castleford in 1944 against Wales.

County League appearances
Jimmy Robinson played in Castleford's victory in the Yorkshire League during the 1938–39 season.

Club career
Robinson made his début for Wigan as a World War II guest player, he played , and scored a try in the 6-3 victory over Barrow at Central Park, Wigan on Saturday 14 April 1945.

References

External links
(archived by web.archive.org) Profile at thecastlefordtigers.co.uk
Heritage Numbers - In Debut Order 
Heritage Numbers - Listed by A to Z
Jimmy Robinson Memory Box Search at archive.castigersheritage.com
Jim Robinson Memory Box Search at archive.castigersheritage.com

1915 births
1992 deaths
Castleford Tigers players
Dewsbury Rams players
England national rugby league team players
English rugby league players
Oldham R.L.F.C. players
Place of birth missing
Place of death missing
Rugby league centres
St Helens R.F.C. players
Wigan Warriors wartime guest players